The 1922–23 North Carolina Tar Heels men's basketball team represented the University of North Carolina during the 1922–23 NCAA men's basketball season in the United States. The team finished the season with a 15–1 record.

References

North Carolina Tar Heels men's basketball seasons
North Carolina
North Carolina Tar Heels Men's Basketball Team
North Carolina Tar Heels Men's Basketball Team